The Weather in the Streets is a 1983 British romantic drama television film directed by Gavin Millar, written by Julian Mitchell, and starring Michael York, Lisa Eichhorn and Joanna Lumley. Adapted from the 1936 novel of the same title by Rosamond Lehmann, it originally premiered at the London Film Festival on 30 November 1983, before being broadcast on BBC Two on 12 February 1984.

Cast
 Michael York as Rollo Spencer
 Lisa Eichhorn as Olivia Curtis
 Joanna Lumley as Kate
 Rosalind Ayres as Etty
 Faith Brook as Lady Spencer
 Isabel Dean as Mrs. Curtis
 Sebastian Shaw as	Mr. Curtis
 Marcus Gilbert as Kurt
 Charles Grant as Adrian
 Max Hafler as Colin
 Janet Henfrey as Lady Blanche
 Merelina Kendall as	Anna
 John Quarmby as Mr. Treadeven
 Rosie Marcel as Jane
 Jane Myerson as Lady Mary
 Emily Nye as Polly
 Robin Parkinson as Doctor
 Norman Pitt as Sir John
 Holly De Jong as	Marigold
 Eileen Helsby as Woman in the inn
 Charles Pemberton as Train steward
 Ian Fairbairn as 	David Cooke
 Keith Robinson as Footman
 James Walker as Ivor
 Alistair White as Christopher
 Terry Pearson as Partygoer

References

Bibliography
 Goble, Alan. The Complete Index to Literary Sources in Film. Walter de Gruyter, 1999.

External links
 

1983 television films
1983 films
1983 romantic drama films
1980s British films
1980s English-language films
BBC television dramas
British drama television films
British romantic drama films
Films about adultery in the United Kingdom
Films based on British novels
Films based on romance novels
Films directed by Gavin Millar
Films scored by Carl Davis
Films set in the 1920s
Films set in London
Films set in Paris
Romance television films
Television films based on books